Samoylovsky is a rural locality (a khutor) in Kumylzhenskoye Rural Settlement, Kumylzhensky District, Volgograd Oblast, Russia. The population was 1 as of 2010.

Geography 
Samoylovsky is located in forest steppe, on Khopyorsko-Buzulukskaya Plain, on the bank of the Peskovatka River, 15 km west of Kumylzhenskaya (the district's administrative centre) by road. Siskovsky is the nearest rural locality.

References 

Rural localities in Kumylzhensky District